Kemo may refer to:

 Kémo River, Central African Republic
 Kémo, Central African Republic, a prefecture named for the river
 Possel, a settlement at the river's confluence with the Ubangi River founded as Kémo
 KEMO-TV, a television station in Santa Rosa, California, United States
 KOFY-TV, a television station in San Francisco, California, United States, originally KEMO-TV